The Hughes Early Man Sites are a complex of prehistoric archaeological sites in central Kent County, Delaware, near the town of Felton.  The complex includes six areas of concentrated finds located on well-drained knolls.  Finds include a Clovis projectile point, a collection of notched projectile points, bifaces, and remnants of stone tool-making activities.

The sites were listed on the National Register of Historic Places in 1979.

See also
National Register of Historic Places listings in Kent County, Delaware

References

Archaeological sites on the National Register of Historic Places in Delaware
Kent County, Delaware
National Register of Historic Places in Kent County, Delaware